Jan Vos may refer to:

Jan Vos (footballer) (1888–1939), Dutch footballer
Jan Vos (poet) (1612–1667), Dutch poet and playwright
Jan Vos (politician) (born 1972), Dutch politician
Jan Vos (fictional character), played by Clous van Mechelen in radio and television shows by Wim T. Schippers